Fester Mudd: Curse of the Gold is a point-and-click adventure game created by independent Finnish developer Paavo Härkönen for the Linux, Microsoft Windows, Macintosh, Ouya, iOS, Android, and Steam platforms. The game was designed with elements of typical Lucasarts adventure games from the 90s. It was originally meant to be a trilogy, but some time during the development of the second episode, the project was cancelled.

Plot
The game is set in the Wild West. The first episode titled "A Fistful of Pocket Lint" has the inept but keen Fester Mudd receiving news from his brother Bud of striking gold and to meet him in the town of Loamsmouth. Once Fester gets there, he finds his brother is missing. He requires the help of a gunslinger to help him cross the Injun lands, but first needs to raise the money to hire him.

Reception

References

External links
Official Website

Android (operating system) games
IOS games
Linux games
MacOS games
Ouya games
Point-and-click adventure games
Video games developed in Finland
Western (genre) video games
Windows games
2013 video games